Schluderns is a comune (municipality) in South Tyrol in northern Italy, located about  northwest of Bolzano.

Geography

Above Schluderns is the famous castle Churburg from 1250.

The municipality of Schluderns contains the frazione (subdivision) Spondinig (Spondigna).

Schluderns borders the following municipalities: Glurns, Laas, Mals, and Prad am Stilfser Joch.

History

Coat-of-arms
The shield is party per pale of argent and gules; the first part represents half sable wheel with azure torture blades, the second an or sheaf. The torture wheel is the insignia of St. Catherine patron saint of the village, the sheaf represent the cereal production in the municipality. The emblem was granted in 1967.

Society

Linguistic distribution
According to the 2011 census, 98.80% of the population speak German and 1.20% Italian as first language.

Demographic evolution

References

External links
 Homepage of the municipality

Municipalities of South Tyrol